Henryk Marcin Broder (born 20 August 1946, self-designation Henryk Modest Broder) is a Polish-born German journalist, author, and TV personality.

Broder is known for polemics, columns, and comments in written and audiovisual media. Starting as author for liberal and left medias konkret, Frankfurter Rundschau and St. Pauli Report, he became more mainstream and wrote for the magazine Der Spiegel, as well as its online version and the daily Berlin newspaper Der Tagesspiegel. Since 2010, he has been writing for publications of conservative Springer SE Die Welt, Welt am Sonntag and appears in Welt TV. Besides his numerous publications, he appears as a frequent guest on German TV talk shows. In 2010 and 2011, he produced and starred, alongside Egyptian-German writer and political scientist Hamed Abdel-Samad, in the satirical TV series  – Die Deutschland-Safari (a wordplay on "entweder/oder", German for "either/or", "Either Broder – The Germany Safari") on ARD.

Broder is especially interested in Vergangenheitsbewältigung, Islam, Israel, and the Israeli–Palestinian conflict. He sees a close relationship between German criticism of Israel's policies and Antisemitism, a view criticized by, among others, the French-German columnist Alfred Grosser.

Life 

Born in Katowice, Silesia, Poland, Broder moved to Cologne with his family in 1958. Both of his parents were survivors of Nazi death camps. In Cologne, he studied economics, law and psychology but failed to graduate. Together with fellow student and nascent writer , whom he had known since high school times, he founded and edited two short-lived radically liberal quarterlies ("PoPoPo" and "Bubu/Eiapopeyea"). In the late 1960s he took over the  together with the journalist Michel Roger Lang, a then highly successful tabloid newspaper in Hamburg, along with Günter Wallraff, Stefan Aust and the photographer , in order to agitate the working class of the city with a combination of leftist articles, nude photography and lonely hearts ads.

In the 1970s, he wrote for the satirical magazine Pardon. From 1979 to 1981 he published, together with fellow journalist , the periodical "Freie Jüdische Stimme" ("Free Jewish Voice"). In 1981, he left Germany to work in Israel for a while, but continued to write for high-level periodicals as Die Zeit, Profil, Die Weltwoche, and Süddeutsche Zeitung. In the 1980s he also hosted the television talk-show Leute, along with Elke Heidenreich, which ran on Sender Freies Berlin; one of their guests was African-American poet Rita Dove, who had just won the 1987 Pulitzer Prize and is married to Fred Viebahn, Broder's old friend from Cologne.

Broder wrote a series of books which dealt with the relationship between Germans and Jews, respectively the growing German Jewish community. Together with Eike Geisel, Broder published essays, books and a documentary about the Jüdischer Kulturbund (Jewish Cultural Union), a previously unknown chapter of Jewish German cultural life during the Third Reich. He wrote books about foreign policy with special regard to Israel, Islam and the growing German Jewish community.

Ever since Operation Entebbe, Broder grew more and more critical of the German approach towards Israel, and what Broder sees as appeasement towards Islamic threats. In Broder's opinion, Anti-Zionism is in essence anti-Semitic.

Broder's trademark is his polemical, blunt, and quick-witted style. He publishes hate mail and heated exchanges between him and critics on his website. The result of some of Broder's polemics were a series of lawsuits, some won and some lost by him. Many of Broder's writings for outlets such as spiegel.de and welt.de are archived at the Achse des Guten blog, which he, together with two other prominent German journalists, operates as a collaborative platform for the unfettered expression of about two dozen of his colleagues. Broder is also associated with the blog Politically Incorrect and the counter-jihad movement.

Broder is married to a publisher, and they have a grown-up daughter. He lives in Berlin.

Reception 
Broders attitude is controversial. Stefan Niggemeier wrote in the context of right-wing populist statements: "Henryk M. Broder is also a victim of Thilo Sarrazin. For years he has been striving to become the republic's chief provocateur... ."

Awards 

 1986 Preis des 5. International Publizistikwettbewerbs Klagenfurt
 2005 Schubart-Literaturpreis
 2007  for Broder's online journalism, especially the way he treated the Jyllands-Posten Muhammad cartoons controversy
 2007 Ludwig-Börne-Preis

Works 
 Wer hat Angst vor Pornographie? Ein Porno-Report, Melzer, Darmstadt 1970
 As co-author: Die Schere im Kopf. Über Zensur und Selbstzensur, Köln 1976
 Danke schön. Bis hierher und nicht weiter. Mit Beiträgen von Detlef Hartmann, Ulrich Klug, Uwe Maeffert, Ulrich Vultejus, Konkret Literatur-Verlag, Hamburg 1980
 Der Ewige Antisemit. Über Sinn und Funktion eines beständigen Gefühls, 1986
 Fremd im eigenen Land. Juden in der Bundesrepublik, 1987
 Ich liebe Karstadt und andere Lobreden, 1987
 with Geisel, Eike: Premiere und Pogrom. Der Jüdische Kulturbund 1933–1941. Texte und Bilder, Siedler, Berlin 1992 
 Erbarmen mit den Deutschen, 1993
 Schöne Bescherung! Unterwegs im Neuen Deutschland, 1994
 Volk und Wahn, Goldmann, München 1996
 Die Juden von Mea Shearim, 1997
 Die Irren von Zion, Hoffmann und Campe, Hamburg 1998
 Jedem das Seine, Ölbaum Verlag 1999
 www.deutsche-leidkultur.de, Ölbaum Verlag 1999
 Kein Krieg, nirgends: Die Deutschen und der Terror, Berlin Verlag, Berlin 2002
 A Jew in the New Germany, University of Illinois Press, Champaign, 2003
 Hurra, wir kapitulieren – Von der Lust am Einknicken, wjs Verlag, 2006
 Kritik der reinen Toleranz, wjs Verlag, Berlin 2008
 Vergesst Auschwitz! Der deutsche Erinnerungswahn und die Endlösung der Israel-Frage, Albrecht Knaus Verlag, Munich 2012

Audio 
 Ach So! Gad Granach und Henryk Broder on Tour, CD, Ölbaum-Verlag, Augsburg 2000,

See also 
 Evelyn Hecht-Galinski

References

External links 

Henryk Broder's official homepage, 
Henryk Broder's page at Die Achse des Guten
Henryk Broder unofficial Facebook fan page
 Review: The last days of Europe, a lecture in Maastricht by Henryk Broder, 28 February 2007
Broder's speech at the 2007 Ludwig-Börne-Preis 

1946 births
Living people
People from Katowice
20th-century Polish Jews
Counter-jihad activists
German essayists
German male journalists
German journalists
20th-century German journalists
21st-century German journalists
German non-fiction writers
Writers on antisemitism
German male writers
German critics of Islam
Polish emigrants to Germany
German male essayists
German Zionists
Die Welt people